Milan "Ciga" Vasojević (27 December 1932 – 24 December 1996) was a Serbian professional basketball coach and administrator. He led the national team of Yugoslavia during the greatest successes of women's basketball.

Coaching career

Radnički 
Vasojević coached the men's team of Radnički Belgrade during 1970s. In 1977, Radnički reached the Cup Winners' Cup Finals where they lost to Forst Cantù by a single point margin, 86–87.

Women's national team 
The arrival of Vasojević as a head coach of the Yugoslavia women's national team in 1980 was almost revolutionary move. The greatest achievements of our women’s Yugoslav national team were to follow. On his debut at the 1980 European Championship in Banja Luka, Vasojević won the bronze medal, and only one month later the same success was achieved at the Summer Olympic Games in Moscow.

The change of generations took place under Vasojević. He offered an opportunity to the younger players he fully believed in such as Anđelija Arbutina, Danira Nakić, Razija Mujanović, Jelica Komnenović, Olivera Krivokapić, Bojana Milošević, Slađana Golić.

At the 1987 Summer Universiade held in Zagreb, Yugoslavia won the gold medal, the only gold ever in women’s senior international competitions. The same year, at the European Championship in Cadiz, Yugoslavia won the silver medal in a tough final game against the Soviet Union which ended with an 83–73 win of the Soviet girls.

The 1988 Summer Olympic Games in Seoul were the crown of one splendid generation. A memorable moment of the semi-final game against Australia is a score of Anđelija Arbutina one second before the game end (57:56) for a place in the Olympic finals. The final game for the Olympic gold medal against the United States national team ended with a 77–70 win of the American girls, but the Yugoslavs showed all their talent and strongly resisted the USA team until the very end of the game.

Post-coaching career 
Vasojević was the first director of basketball club Hemofarm from Vršac takes office in 1995.

Legacy 
In 2006, the Basketball Federation of Serbia named the national cup for women in his honor.

In November 2022, he was introduced to the FIBA Hall of Fame.

See also 
 List of members of the FIBA Hall of Fame
 Milan Ciga Vasojević Cup

References

1932 births
1996 deaths
BKK Radnički coaches
FIBA Hall of Fame inductees
Yugoslav basketball coaches
Serbian men's basketball coaches
Sportspeople from Belgrade
Serbian expatriate basketball people in Italy
ŽKK Crvena zvezda coaches
Olympic bronze medalists for Yugoslavia
Olympic silver medalists for Yugoslavia
Olympic medalists in basketball
Medalists at the 1980 Summer Olympics
Medalists at the 1988 Summer Olympics